Sabis may refer to:

SABIS, global school network
Battle of the Sabis
The river Sambre (Sabis in Latin)
Sabis Vallis, valley on Mars named after the river Sabis

See also
The Sword of Knowledge, a trilogy of fantasy novels the first of which is called A Dirge for Sabis